The Córas Iompair Éireann 071 Class or Northern Ireland Railways 111 Class is a General Motors Electro-Motive Division EMD JT22CW series diesel-electric locomotive used in both the Republic of Ireland and Northern Ireland.
Serbia utilises four similar locomotives as JŽ series 666.

Córas Iompair Éireann 
The Córas Iompair Éireann 071 Class locomotives were the principal passenger locomotives on the Irish railway network for twenty years from their introduction in the late 1970s.  They displaced the older CIÉ 001 Class and NIR 101 Class locomotives and were themselves replaced in turn by the new 201 Class locomotives.

Currently all the CIÉ locomotives remain in service, being used on freight and permanent way trains. NIR 112 was on long-term loan to Iarnród Éireann from April 2003 until September 2006, when it was returned to Northern Ireland Railways.

The locomotives arrived in Ireland on 2 November 1976 and were purchased to facilitate 90 mph running on the Cork and Belfast lines. A trade dispute resulted in a significant delay in their introduction; the first service was operated on 23 May 1977 hauled by 082 on the 14:30 Dublin Heuston to Cork. The class was originally fitted with an EMD 12-645E3B engine but was upgraded to 12-645E3C specification in 1992, along with the installation of yaw dampers to resolve issues of poor ride quality and bogie cracks at high speeds.

In November 2006, IÉ began an overhaul programme of twelve units only, leaving the fate of their remaining six units in doubt. By 2009 fourteen 071s had received the new 'Freight Livery’ however not all had received an overhaul. Those that received a re-paint into the new livery were: Nos. 071, 072, 073, 074, 075, 076, 079, 080, 081, 082, 083, 085, 086 and 088.
On Saturday 14 and 15 November 2009 075 and a Tara Mines train was used in testing of the new bridge at Malahide.

In 2013 an overhaul programme started for all eighteen class members which includes an engine rebuild, refurbished bogies, new panels, new cabs and a new slate grey livery complete with European numbering. As of September 2018, the entire 071 Class has been refurbished. Class members that had been out of use for a number of years have been reinstated into service after overhaul.

In 2016, several members of the class received a commemorative plaque beneath their handbrakes in recognition of their 40 years of service with CIÉ and Iarnród Éireann. Loco 071 was repainted back to its original CIÉ Supertrain livery of black and orange in May 2016, with its first working thereafter being the RPSI diesel tour from Dublin to Waterford and Limerick Junction.

In July 2017, loco 073 was overhauled and repainted back to the original Irish Rail livery dating back to 1987 in order to celebrate the 30th anniversary of the company.

Northern Ireland Railways 

The Class 111 as they are known by NI Railways is identical to the Class 071. NI Railways has three of these locomotives, which are now mainly used for ballasting duties since their replacement on the Enterprise and other passenger duties. These locomotives are numbered 111, 112, and 113.

In 2007, it was announced that NIR's three locomotives were to be converted to push-pull operation. The DBSO driving trailer for this set was delivered in 2009, leading to speculation that this set was to remain in service after 2010, and even see an increased use in  passenger service.

As of 2015 the DBSO has been disposed of, never having been used, and is now preserved at Downpatrick and used as a barrier vehicle for their Class 450 DEMU. The Gatwick Express carriages have also been disposed of to the RPSI, leaving the Class 111 locomotives with no normal passenger duties.  They remain in use for permanent way & engineering duties, and very occasional stock movements and occasional tour trains for the RPSI.

111 and 113 have been tested working in multiple, for use on the steep gradients of the Antrim branch line during ballasting operations, where the additional adhesion at low speed during ballasting is required.

IE/NIR Locomotive Names 
All three of the named Northern Ireland Railways locomotives are named after former railway companies. Two of the Iarnród Éireann Freight locomotives are named. Details are as follows:

Yugoslavia and Serbia 

Four similar EMD JT22CW-2 locomotives are used by Serbian Railways, designated as ŽS series 666. They were originally intended by Yugoslav Railways for use with Tito's special Blue Train, hence their all blue livery. These locomotives differ from the Irish units in being standard gauge rather than Irish 5 ft 3 in gauge and having a full width car-body. After the dissolution of Yugoslavia, the locomotives have been used to haul freight and passenger trains. Three locomotives are currently not operational and awaiting overhaul, while 003 (Sutjeska) started running test rides in January 2015 after an overhaul in Kraljevo. On Friday 23 January 2015 003 re-entered service.

ŽS Locomotive Names 
All four Class 666 locomotives of Yugoslav Railways were named after toponyms important to the People's Liberation War.

Fleet

Additional technical details 
 Auxiliary Alternator: D14
 Auxiliary Generator: A-8147M1, 
 Power at rail: 
 Storage Battery: 32 cells, 420 ampere hours
 Bogies: Flexicoil
 Wheel Diameter: 
 Compressor/Exhauster: Model ABOV
 Height over horn: 
 Width: 
 Fuel Tank: 
 Min Turning Radius: 
 Multiple working: To AAR, with all IÉ & NIR GM locos
 Nos. 111 and 112 were modified by NIR to provide head end power to coaching stock in the early 1990s, however this capability was seldom used and is now isolated.

Accidents and incidents 
On 21 August 1983, locomotive 086 was hauling a passenger train which ran into the back of a passenger train near Cherryville Junction, County Kildare. Seven people were killed and 55 were injured.

Gallery

Model 
The 071 Class was available as a 00 gauge Resin kit by Model Irish Railways (MIR) but is no longer made. It included transfers, brass detailing (railings, fans, grills) and flush glazing. Note the paint included is the Golden Brown hue and not the existing deep orange (RAL2011).

Murphy Models have released an '00' gauge ready to run model of the 071 class. This has been available since October 2012.

Both the 071 and 111 class have been produced as player drivable locomotives in the Microsoft Train Simulator add-on, "Irish Enterprise North" by Making Tracks.

See also 
 JŽ 666 (EMD JT22CW-2) locomotives replaced the JŽ 761 on Tito's Blue Train.
 Serbian Railways
 List of GM-EMD locomotives

References

External links 

 Eiretrains – Irish Locomotives

Co-Co locomotives
Electro-Motive Division locomotives
Iarnród Éireann locomotives
Diesel-electric locomotives of Northern Ireland
Diesel-electric locomotives of Serbia
Railway locomotives introduced in 1976
5 ft 3 in gauge locomotives
Diesel-electric locomotives of Ireland
Diesel-electric locomotives of Yugoslavia
Passenger locomotives
Co'Co' Diesel Locomotives of Europe